Jeseydan (also Romanized as Jeseydān) is a village in Kurka Rural District, in the Central District of Astaneh-ye Ashrafiyeh County, Gilan Province, Iran. At the 2006 census, its population was 41, in 13 families.

References 

Populated places in Astaneh-ye Ashrafiyeh County